In the mathematical theory of Kleinian groups, the Ahlfors finiteness theorem describes the quotient of the domain of discontinuity by a finitely generated Kleinian group.

The Ahlfors finiteness theorem  states that if Γ is a finitely-generated Kleinian group  with region of discontinuity Ω, then
Ω/Γ has a finite number of components, each of which is a compact Riemann surface with a finite number of points removed.

Bers area inequality

It states that if Γ is a non-elementary finitely-generated Kleinian group with N generators and with region of discontinuity Ω, then
Area(Ω/Γ) ≤ 
with equality only for Schottky groups. (The area is given by the Poincaré metric in each component.)
Moreover, if Ω1 is an invariant component then
Area(Ω/Γ) ≤ 2Area(Ω1/Γ)
with equality only for Fuchsian groups of the first kind (so in particular there can be at most two invariant components).

References

Discrete groups
Lie groups
Kleinian groups
Theorems in analysis